Víctor Manuel Adriazola Ortiz (born 3 June 1943) is a Chilean footballer. He played in nine matches for the Chile national football team in 1967. He was also part of Chile's squad for the 1967 South American Championship.

References

External links
 

1943 births
Living people
Chilean footballers
Chile international footballers
Place of birth missing (living people)
Association football defenders
Club Deportivo Universidad Católica footballers
Chilean Primera División players